The Saint Francis Red Flash are the 23 sports teams representing Saint Francis University in Loretto, Pennsylvania in intercollegiate athletics. The Red Flash competes in the NCAA Division I and are primary members of the Northeast Conference, with women's field hockey competing in the Atlantic 10 Conference, men's volleyball in the Eastern Intercollegiate Volleyball Association, and women's water polo in the Collegiate Water Polo Association.

Teams 
Men's sports
 Basketball (team article)
 Cross Country
 Football  (team article) 
 Golf 
 Soccer 
 Tennis
 Track & Field (Indoor & Outdoor)
 Volleyball 

Women's sports
 Basketball (team article)
 Bowling 
 Cross Country
 Field Hockey *
 Golf 
 Lacrosse 
 Soccer
 Softball
 Swimming & Diving
 Tennis
 Track & Field (Indoor & Outdoor)
 Volleyball
 Water Polo^

 * = The field hockey team is an associate member of the Atlantic 10 Conference.
 ^ = The women's water polo team is a member of the Collegiate Water Polo Association

References

External links